Travis Stewart, better known as Machinedrum, is an American electronic record producer and performer from North Carolina. He is also known as Syndrone and Tstewart. He is one half of Sepalcure, with Praveen Sharma, one half of JETS, with Jimmy Edgar, as well as half of Dream Continuum with Jim Coles, a.k.a. Om Unit.

Biography 
Travis Stewart was born in Eden, North Carolina. He was exposed to a wide range of musical influences in his childhood. His grandfather played pedal steel for a country band, and gave Stewart his first guitar. His first recordings were made at his grandparents' house, around the age of 5 or 6. His parents kept a house full of instruments, and a singer-songwriter cousin continually exposed him to new sounds and ideas. He fostered an interest with polyrhythms while playing marching snare in his high school band, and the djembe in an African ensemble. Stewart played in two local alternative bands, marching band, jazz band as well as several percussion ensembles before turning more towards electronic music around the time of 8th grade. Using handed down computers, he began to produce his own music, and connected with a community of likeminded musicians over the Internet. He started the Machinedrum project during his final two years of high school, between 1998 and 1999. After graduation, he attended Full Sail University in Florida to study audio engineering. In 2001, at the age of 19, he released his first record as Machinedrum, "Now You Know", on Merck Records.

Following college, Stewart moved to New York City and got involved with Brooklyn-based boutique label Normrex, and has during that time collaborated with such artists as Tiombe Lockhart, Theophilus London, Jesse Boykins III, Azealia Banks and Mickey Factz, among others. For Theophilus London, Stewart produced and mixed the Jam Mixtape as well as This Charming Mixtape. For Azealia Banks, he produced the tracks Barbie Shit, Luxury, 1991, Van Vogue, L8R, and Fantasea among others. From 2001–2010, Stewart is credited for having released 8 albums, as well as numerous remixes, mixes, singles, and EPs.

Stewart's collaboration with Praveen Sharma, known as Sepalcure, began after the two had collaborated on parties Percussion Lab and Cassette NYC, then decided to record music together, which gained the attention of Hotflush Recordings, who signed the duo. Pitchfork considered their self-titled LP one of 2011's Top 50 albums, and the song "Pencil Pimp" made the list of 2011's Top 100 Tracks. In 2010, Stewart and Sharma wrote and performed the song "Outside the Lines" for the film Black Swan.

Also in 2010, Stewart signed to the label LuckyMe and released the Many Faces EP, followed by the "Alarma" single in 2011 and the SXLND  EP in 2012. In 2011, Stewart released the album Room(s), on Planet Mu. The album was made mostly on the road, with Stewart limited to his laptop and headphones. His single "She Died There" was featured in the video game Grand Theft Auto V on the fictional radio station FlyLo FM..  In 2013, Stewart signed to Ninja Tune and announced his debut LP for the label, Vapor City which was to be released later that year.  Since then Machinedrum has released two more LPs on Ninja Tune: Human Energy in 2016 and A View Of U in 2020.  Additionally he went on to produce most of Dawn Richard's 2016 album "Redemption", as well as collaborated with artists like A$AP Ferg, Freddie Gibbs, Sub Focus, Rochelle Jordan, Tigran Hamasyan and many more.

JETS, a collaboration formed in 2012 between Stewart and long time friend Jimmy Edgar, have released 1 LP "Zoospa" and 3 EPs together.  They continue to produce music for artists like Tanerélle, Flohio, and B-La-B as well as collaborating with artists like Tkay Maidza, Theophilus London, Dawn Richard, Mykki Blanco and Roses Gabor.

Travis has recently scored the music for a new German true crime drama series called "Das Geheimnis Des Totenwaldes".

As a performer, Stewart has played such venues as the Sydney Opera House, the Nokia Theater in New York City, Zócalo Plaza in Mexico City, The Roundhouse in London, the Sonar Music Festival '11, '12, '14 and '15 in Barcelona, and SXSW.

Personal life 
On 14 June 2021, Stewart announced the birth of his youngest child named Billie Josephine.

Discography

Albums
Syndrone: Triskaideka — Merck (2000)
Machinedrum: Now You Know — Merck (2001)
Machinedrum: Half the Battle — Merck (2001)
Machinedrum: Urban Biology — Merck (2002)
Syndrone: Salmataxia — Merck (2004)
Machinedrum: Bidnezz — Merck (2004)
Tstewart: Living Exponentially — Merck (2006)
Machinedrum: Mergerz & Acquisitionz — Merck (2006)
Machinedrum: Cached — The Inside (2006)
Machinedrum: Want to 1 2? — Normrex (2009)
Sepalcure: Sepalcure — Hotflush (2011)
Machinedrum: Room(s) — Planet Mu (2011)
Machinedrum: Vapor City – Ninja Tune (2013)
Machinedrum: Vapor City Archives – Ninja Tune (2014)
Machinedrum: Human Energy – Ninja Tune (2016)
Sepalcure: Folding Time – Hotflush (2016)
JETS (with Jimmy Edgar): ZOOSPA – Innovative Leisure (2019)
Machinedrum: A View of U – Ninja Tune (2020)

Singles and EPs
Syndrone: Triskaideka EP — Merck (2001)
Machinedrum: "Half the Battle 2" — Merck (2003)
Machinedrum: "Half the Battle 3" — (2004)
Machinedrum: "Late Night Operation" — Normrex (2009)
Machinedrum: Many Faces EP — LuckyMe (2010)
Machinedrum: Let It EP — Innovative Leisure (2010)
Sepalcure: "Love Pressure" — Hotflush (2010)
Machinedrum: Sacred Frequency EP — Planet Mu (2011)
Machinedrum: "Alarma 12"" — LuckyMe (2011)
Sepalcure: "Fleur" — Hotflush (2011)
Machinedrum: "Ecstasy Boom" — Independent (2011)
Machinedrum: "SXLND" — LuckyMe (2012)
Machinedrum: Nastyfuckk EP — The Index (2012)
JETS: "JETS" — Leisure System (2012)
Machinedrum: "Eyesdontlie" – Ninja Tune (2013)
Machinedrum: "Gunshotta Ave." – Ninja Tune (2013)
Machinedrum: "Fenris District" – Ninja Tune (2014)
Machinedrum: "Angel Speak" (feat. Melo-X) - Ninja Tune (2016)
Machinedrum: 'What Is This" - Ninja Tune (2017)
Machinedrum: "1 2 B Needed" - Ninja Tune (2017)
Machinedrum: "Hype Up" - Ninja Tune (2018)
Machinedrum: "Psyconia" - Ninja Tune (2021)

Selected remixes 
Jacques Greene – "The Look" (Machinedrum remix)
New Villager – "Rich Doors" (Machinedrum remix)
Grems feat. Foreign Beggars – "Broabilly" (Machinedrum remix)
Salva – "Keys Open Doors" (Machinedrum remix)
Sub Swara feat. Dead Prez – "Speak My Language" (Machinedrum remix)
Johnny Cash – "Belshazzar" (Machinedrum remix)
Solange – "Sandcastle Disco" (Machinedrum remix)
Sound Tribe Sector 9 – "Tokyo" (Machinedrum remix)
Edit – "Certified Air Raid Material" (Machinedrum remix)
Lazer Sword – "Gucci Sweatshirt" (Neon Black mix)
Mochipet – "African Trampoline" (Machinedrum mix)
Bonobo feat. Andreya Triana – "Eyesdown" (Machinedrum remix)
Scuba – "M.A.R.S" (Machinedrum Remix)
Gang Colours – "Fancy Restaurant" (Machinedrum remix)
Dominique Young Unique – "Stupid Pretty" (machinedrum remix)
Son of Kick – "Playing the Villain" (Machinedrum remix)
The Glitch Mob – "Between Two Dreams" (Machinedrum Convergence)
Rudimental feat. Will Heard & Anne-Marie – "Rumour Mill" (Machinedrum remix)
Noisia - "Get Deaded" (Machinedrum remix)
Hermitude feat. Bibi Bourelly - "Stupid World" (Machinedrum remix)

References

American electronic musicians
Intelligent dance musicians
Tracker musicians
Living people
People from Eden, North Carolina
Musicians from North Carolina
Hotflush Recordings artists
Planet Mu artists
Year of birth missing (living people)